Bosteri is a village in the Issyk-Kul Region of Kyrgyzstan. It is part of the Issyk-Kul District. Its population was 8,908 in 2021. The town is entirely devoted to mass tourism. There are soviet-era hotels and sanitoria. To the west along highway A363 is Cholpon-Ata, and to the east Korumdu.

Population

References

Populated places in Issyk-Kul Region